Merrifieldia caspius is a moth of the family Pterophoridae that is found in Russia, Kyrgyzstan Iran, Afghanistan, Turkey and India.

References

Moths described in 1870
caspius
Moths of Asia